Canadian administrative law is the body of law that addresses the actions and operations of governments and governmental agencies in Canada. That is, the law concerns the manner in which courts can review the decisions of administrative decision makers such as a board, tribunal, commission, agency, or Crown minister, while exercising ministerial discretion.

Administrative law is concerned primarily with the legality of administrative decision making and with issues of procedural fairness (rights for those affected by the decision to participate in the decision making process). Administrative law concerns the interpretation of statutes and rules of government operations. Courts, when applying administrative law, look to ensure that administrative or governmental actors and bodies observe and act within the legal limits on their authority.

Sources of law 
The powers of an administrative decision-maker ("ADM") are primarily created by statute, which is known as the "enabling statute". These powers are limited by the legislative authority of the enabling government provided under section 91 or 92 of the Constitution Act, 1867. Superior Courts (known as Section 96 Courts) have an inherent power at common law to review any decision of an ADM. A judicial review allows for the court to consider the entire decision-making process, including the process, the findings of fact and of law. The power of judicial review is found either in the enabling statute or by virtue of the common law. The common law powers are derived from the four original writs of certiorari, prohibition, mandamus and habeas corpus.

These powers are also frequently limited by privative clauses or finality clauses within the enabling statute. A privative clause will declare the ADMs decision is "final and conclusive" and/or that the ADM has "exclusive jurisdiction" over the matter, effectively removing any power of review. As established in Crevier v Quebec (AG), [1981] 2 SCR 220, the Constitution requires that the courts be able to supervise errors of ADMs and so the legislature cannot completely oust the courts from that power, nor can an ADM completely replace the courts.

Appellate review 

Courts may review a decision through a statutory appeal when such appeal is explicitly provided by the enabling statute that created the administrative body. The scope of such appeal is defined and described by the terms of the enabling statute.

In Canada (Minister of Citizenship and Immigration) v Vavilov, the Supreme Court of Canada held that where a statute provides for an appeal from an administrative decision to a court, it has subjected the administrative regime to appellate oversight and indicated that it expects the court to scrutinize such administrative decisions on an appellate basis.

A court hearing such an appeal must apply appellate standards of review to the administrative decision. This means that when considering questions of law raised in the appeal, the court would apply the standard of correctness. When reviewing questions of fact (or questions of mixed fact and law when the legal principle is not readily extricable), the court applies the standard of "palpable and overriding error". The legislature is free to deviate from this appellate standard of review by prescribing a different standard in the applicable statute.

Substantive review 

When performing substantive review, formally a Judicial Review, the court considers the merits of an administrative decision and determines if the decision is so defective that it should be remitted to a different decision maker for reconsideration.

Background 

Prior to the landmark decision of Canada (Minister of Citizenship and Immigration) v Vavilov, 2019 SCC 65, courts undertake a standard of review analysis to determine the level of scrutiny that should be applied in the review of an administrative decision. Under the standard of review analysis, courts consider factors such as precedents, the relative expertise of the decision maker, the nature of the issue in dispute and the content and context of the governing legislation.

Standards of review 

There are two standards of review available to courts: reasonableness and correctness. A third standard of review, patent unreasonableness, was previously abolished in Dunsmuir.

The standard of reasonableness is the default and presumptive standard of review that applies to all administrative decisions. This presumption may be rebutted in two situations: (i) where the legislation has indicated that a standard of correctness applies, and (ii) where the rule of law requires that the standard of correctness applies. The second situation is engaged for certain categories of questions, such as constitutional questions, general questions of law of central importance to the legal system as a whole and questions related to the jurisdictional boundaries between two or more administrative bodies.

In Vavilov, the Supreme Court of Canada explicitly did away with the contextual analysis for standard of review previously established in Dunsmuir, in an effort to streamline and simplify the standard of review framework. In so doing, the Supreme Court of Canada sought to give greater effect and meaning to the express statutory right of appeal, which is understood to be the key factor representing legislative intention on the standard of review to be applied in judicial review of an administrative decision. The presence of an express statutory right of appeal in the enabling statute is understood to mean that the legislature intended the courts to play an appellate role, and apply a less deferential standard of review. Concomitantly, it is presumed from the lack of a statutory of appeal that the Legislature intended the courts to apply a more deferential standard of review, namely, the standard of reasonableness. It is unnecessary to undertake a separate analytical framework to decide what standard of review should apply.

Reasonableness
Reasonableness is the deferential standard of review that presumptively applies to all administrative decisions.  Reasonableness review focuses on the decision actually made by the decision maker, including both the decision maker's reasoning process and the outcome. The reviewing court must refrain from deciding the issue themselves, and must consider only whether the decision made by the administrative decision maker, including both its rationale and outcome, was unreasonable. 

In particular, the reviewing court asks whether the decision bears the hallmarks of reasonableness — justification, transparency and intelligibility — and whether it is justified in relation to the relevant factual and legal constraints that bear on the decision. A reasonable decision is one that is based on an internally coherent and rational chain of analysis and that is justified in relation to the facts and law that constrain the decision maker.

Any shortcomings or flaws relied on by the party challenging the decision must be sufficiently central or significant to render the decision unreasonable. In Vavilov, the [Supreme Court of Canada] gave, as example, two types of fundamental flaws in an administrative decision. First is a failure of rationality internal to the reasoning process. The second arises when a decision is in some respect untenable in light of the relevant factual and legal constraints that bear on it.

Reasonableness review is not a line-by-line treasure hunt for error, but the reviewing court must be able to trace the decision maker's reasoning without encountering any fatal flaws in its overarching logic, and there must be a line of analysis within the given reasons that could reasonably lead the tribunal from the evidence before it to the conclusion at which it arrived.

A decision must also be justified in relation to the constellation of law and facts that are relevant to the decision. A reviewing court may find a decision unreasonable when it is examined against contextual considerations such as the governing statutory scheme; other relevant statutory or common law; the principles of statutory interpretation; the evidence before the decision maker and facts of which the decision maker may take notice; the submissions of the parties; the past practices and decisions of the administrative body; and the potential impact of the decision on the individual to whom it applies.

The reviewing court must refrain from “reweighing and reassessing the evidence considered by the decision maker”. However, the reasonableness of a decision may be jeopardized where the decision maker has fundamentally misapprehended or failed to account for the evidence before it.

In Vavilov, the Supreme Court of Canada recognized that the review of reasonableness may be challenging in contexts where formal reasons have not been, and are not required to be provided for a decision. Nonetheless, the reviewing court must look to the record as a whole to understand the decision, and in doing so, the court will often uncover a clear rationale for the decision. When no reasons have been provided and neither the record nor the larger context sheds light on the basis for the decision, the reviewing court must still examine the decision in light of the relevant constraints on the decision maker in order to determine whether the decision is reasonable.

Correctness
Correctness is the less deferential standard that a court can give to an administrative decision maker. The court will give no deference at all and will judge the decision on the basis of whether it is correct in law. A court may substitute its own opinion for that of the decision maker.

Certain matters have been held by the court to always warrant a correctness standard: questions of constitutional law and division of powers, a "true question of jurisdiction" (in determining whether an administrative decision-maker has properly exercised its authority granted under a statute),  questions of general law that are both of central importance to the legal system as a whole and outside the adjudicator's specialized area of expertise, and questions regarding jurisdictional lines between two or more competing specialized tribunals.

Patent unreasonableness

The standard of "patent unreasonableness" was abolished by the Supreme Court of Canada in Dunsmuir.

Patent unreasonableness was the highest level of deference that the court could previously give to a decision maker, before it was abolished. This standard was found to be dissatisfactory as it allowed certain decisions that were unreasonable but not patently unreasonable to be upheld, giving rise to situations where individuals had to accept a decision of an administrative body that is nonetheless unreasonable.

A number of provincial statutes, most notably British Columbia's Administrative Tribunals Act, continue to adopt the patent unreasonableness standard. Because a statute is superior to common law, the patent unreasonableness standard is applicable when courts apply these statutes

Procedural fairness 
Procedural fairness concerns the rights of individuals affected by a decision to participate in that decision making process. These procedural rights flow from two principles of natural justice, the right to be heard (audi alteram partem) and right to be judged impartially (nemo judex in sua causa). The source of these rights can be found in the Canadian Charter of Rights and Freedoms, general legislations that govern administrative decision making, an administrative decision maker's enabling legislation, and the common law.

Legitimate expectation
Legitimate expectation of procedural fairness applies:
 
"When a public authority had promised to follow a certain procedure, it is in the interest of good administration that it should act fairly and should implement its promise, so long as implementation does not interfere with its statutory duty."<ref>Lord Fraser, Attorney General of Hong Kong v. Ng Yuen Shiu, [1983]</ref>
In this way the courts have found procedural fairness through a promise by an ADM. There are requirements for what constitutes a legitimate expectation.

The test is:Gaw v Commissioner of Corrections (1986), 2 FTR 122 
 A public authority makes a promise,
 That promise is to follow a certain procedure,
 In respect to an interested person, and
 They relied and acted upon that promise

According to Canadian Union of Public Employees v Ontario (Minister of Labour), if the promise is clear, unambiguous and unqualified representation as to a procedure, then it creates a legitimate expectation. This applies also to an established practice or conduct of a given ADM.

Legitimate expectation will not apply when dealing with a legislative decision, promises that conflict with statutory duties, and substantive promises.

Duty of fairness
The common law imposes a minimum duty of fairness in certain administrative proceedings. The duty can only be invoked where the circumstances satisfy a threshold based on three factors set out by the Supreme Court in Knight v Indian Head School Division No 19.Knight v Indian Head School Division No 19, [1990] 1 SCR 653 
 First, the nature of the decision must be sufficiently administrative or quasi-judicial. Decisions that are of a "legislative or general nature" which are based on broad policy issues rather than points of law are not likely to warrant a duty of fairness. Furthermore, the decisions must be final in nature, not preliminary or interlocutory.
 Second, the relationship between the (public) body and the individual must be based on an exercise of power pursuant to a statute (or prerogative power).
 Third, the decision must affect the claimant's rights, privileges or interests.

Where the circumstances satisfy the threshold test to invoke a duty of fairness a claimant will be entitled to certain participatory rights including pre-hearing rights, such as rights related notice, disclosure, discovery, and delay, as well as hearing rights, such as rights related to the form of hearing, counsel, examinations, and reasons for judgment.

Content of Duty of Fairness: Baker TestBaker v Canada (Minister of Citizenship and Immigration) clarified administrative law in Canada in relation to both substantive matters (discretionary decision making) and procedural matters (procedural fairness).

The content of the duty of fairness depends on the type of right and the circumstances of the case. There are five factors that affect the content of this duty:

 The nature of the decision. It asks whether the decision is more for the purpose of resolving dispute, protecting individual rights or some other judicial purpose rather than a decision that balances many interests and primarily considers policy.
 The statutory scheme under which the decision is made. This primarily focuses on whether the decision is final and conclusive or if it is preliminary or if there is a right of appeal.
 The importance of the interest at stake in the decision relative to other interests.
 The legitimate expectations of the parties based on whether there were any representations by word or conduct that lead the parties to believe there was some type of procedural protection.
 The procedural choices available to the ADM. The ADM must be accorded some deference to its practices and policies necessary to accomplish its mandate.

With respect to discretion, historically, the standard of review for discretionary decisions applied by the courts was that of correctness. However, this changed in Baker where the Supreme Court of Canada emphasized the awkward line between questions of law and discretion. The court recognized that the 'pragmatic and functional' approach, as outlined in Pushpanathan, should be applied when looking at issues of discretion. In addition, courts are able to apply a standard of reasonableness to discretionary decision making.

Bias and independence
Administrative tribunals must be free from an appearance of bias - that is, a reasonable person must conclude that an administrative decision-maker is sufficiently free of factors that could interfere with the ability to make impartial judgments (commonly known as the "reasonable apprehension of bias" test) This is derived from the natural justice principle of nemo judex in sua causa, or the right to be judged impartially.

Independence is one important indicator of whether there is an appearance of bias in an administrative body. Although administrative independence is not required to be as strict as judicial independence, there are still certain minimum requirements such as security of tenure and independent administrative control. However, administrative independence is not guaranteed under the constitution, and can be ousted by statutory language.

Once a court has determined that there has been a reasonable apprehension of bias, the decision in question must be void ab initio, as there is no remedy for the damage created by the apprehension of bias.

 References 

 Sources 
 

 See also National Corn Growers Assn v Canada (Import Tribunal)'' (1990).

 
Administrative law